Red Rock Village Museum or Hongyancun Museum is a museum in Yuzhong District, Chongqing, China. It was a diplomatic site for the Chinese Communist Party, led by Zhou Enlai during World War II.

The museum is the site where Mao Zedong signed the Double Tenth Agreement for peace between the Communist Party and the rival Kuomintang on 10 October 1945.

Transportation
The museum is served by  station and  station on Line 9 of Chongqing Rail Transit.

See also
 Double Tenth Agreement

References

Yuzhong District
Museums with year of establishment missing
Museums in Chongqing
History museums in China
Politics of Chongqing
History of Chongqing
Aftermath of World War II
Mao Zedong